Beit Guvrin (lit. House of Men in Aramaic) is a kibbutz in the Lakhish region, west of the ancient city of Beit Guvrin, for which it is named. Located 14 kilometres east of Kiryat Gat, it falls under the jurisdiction of Yoav Regional Council. In  it had a population of 414.

History

Kibbutz Beit Guvrin was founded in 1949, on the eve of Shavuot, by former Palmach members after the Palestinian Arab residents of Bayt Jibrin fled the military assault by Jewish forces during the 1948 Arab–Israeli War. The first residents were members of the "Yetzivim" youth group, which emigrated from Turkey in 1945, and the "Bnei Horin" youth group, which emigrated from Romania in 1946.

The kibbutz was established on the fields to the north of the Arab village of Bayt Jibrin, which sat atop what was once a Hebrew town known as Beit Guvrin that was later renamed Eleutheropolis, "the city of free men" by the Romans in 200 CE. It was later the site of a Frankish colony, "Bethgibelin", before becoming better known by its Arabic moniker "Bayt Jibrin" following the Muslim conquest.

Economy
The economy was formerly based on chicken coops, cowsheds and field crops. BG Technologies is located on the kibbutz. Other kibbutz-run businesses are a banquet hall, a clothing and gift store, a jewelry store, a dental clinic and a public swimming pool.

Landmarks

The kibbutz is surrounded by antiquities from the 1st century BC – 2nd-century CE town of Beit Guvrin. the Beit Guvrin-Maresha National Park is a popular tourist destination which includes Hellenistic-period caves with wall paintings, columbaria, a Roman city and ruins of a Crusader castle.
 
The area is surrounded by many Islamic shrines (maqam)  like Nabi Jibrin, Sheikh Mahmoud, etc., but the holiest of them is Maqam Tamim al-Dari dedicated to a companion of Muhammad who had control over the Hebron district which included the Cave of the Patriarchs.
Today all the Muslim shrines are abandoned.

Jesus Christ Superstar (1973) was filmed here.

References

Kibbutzim
Kibbutz Movement
Yoav Regional Council
Populated places established in 1949
Archaeological sites in Israel
Populated places in Southern District (Israel)
1949 establishments in Israel